East Barsham is a village and former civil parish, now in the parish of Barsham, in the North Norfolk district, in the English county of Norfolk. In 1931 the parish had a population of 144. On 1 April 1935 the parish was abolished to form Barsham.

The village is one of four settlements within the parish of Barsham. The other villages are North Barsham, West Barsham and Houghton St Giles. East Barsham is 3 miles north of the town of Fakenham, 23.8 miles west of Cromer and 117 miles north of London.

The nearest railway station is at Sheringham for the Bittern Line which runs between Sheringham, Cromer and Norwich. The nearest airport is Norwich International Airport.

East Barsham Manor
East Barsham Manor is an early Tudor manor house built in 1520. The house is constructed from red brick and tile. The roof is adorned with chimneys, some with twists and finials built in a mellow brick. Some of the brickwork is thought not to be original being from restoration work carried out in 1919 and 1938. The gatehouse dates from a later period. The house was built between 1520 and 1530 for Sir Henry Fermor. Henry VIII was once a guest at the manor house on his way to a pilgrimage at Walsingham. Henry VIII walked the two miles from the manor, barefoot, to the shrine at Walsingham.

The Parish Church
All Saints church is now only the remnant of a once larger church. The tower dates from the 17th century and is truncated to a little above the roofline of the nave. It now serves as the porch on the north side of the nave. This arrangement is very unusual in north Norfolk. The porch probably stands on the north side because that is where the manor house is. The church is Grade II* listed. The war memorial, opposite the church, is Grade II listed.

The 18th Baron Hastings, Fr Delaval Loftus Astley, was Rector (priest) of East Barsham. He died in 1872.

The White Horse Inn
The White Horse Inn is situated next to East Barsham Manor. The inn originates from the 17th century and is Grade II listed. It is a free house and has limited and basic accommodation.

Pear Tree Cottage
Pear Tree Cottage is situated on Water Lane. It is a traditional brick and flint Norfolk cottage with an attached barn. It lay derelict for many years but was completely renovated in 2012. It now offers luxury bed and breakfast accommodation.

There are two unusual stone features, possibly ecclesiastical, built into the barn wall.

References

External links

Villages in Norfolk
Former civil parishes in Norfolk
North Norfolk